D. flavescens may refer to:

 Dactylorhiza flavescens, a marsh orchid
 Dalea flavescens, a prairie clover
 Danthonia flavescens, an oatgrass eaten by takahe
 Darapsa flavescens, a Northern American moth
 Dasytes flavescens, a soft-wing flower beetle
 Dendroica flavescens, a bird endemic to the Bahamas
 Dichodontium flavescens, a dioicous moss
 Diodia flavescens, a flowering plant
 Diplomitoporus flavescens, a bracket fungus
 Diuris flavescens, a herbaceous plant
 Dorymyrmex flavescens, a cone ant
 Drilus flavescens, a click beetle
 Drosera flavescens, a carnivorous plant
 Dunbaria flavescens, a flowering plant
 Dysoxylum flavescens, a Malesian plant